Dustin W. Fry (born October 3, 1983) is a former American football center and former offensive line coach for Arkansas Razorbacks and SMU Mustangs football. He was drafted by the St. Louis Rams in the fifth round of the 2007 NFL Draft. He played college football at Clemson.

Fry was also a member of the Cleveland Browns, Carolina Panthers and Denver Broncos.

College career
Fry played college football at Clemson where he played in 47 games, starting 36, registering 171 knockdown blocks on 2,192 plays. He was a sports management major.

Professional career

Pre-draft
Fry pulled a muscle during the NFL combine and did not attempt the agility drills, however, he bench pressed 225 pounds 34 times and ran a 5.28 forty-yard dash.

St. Louis Rams
Fry was selected by the St. Louis Rams in the fifth round (139th overall) of the 2007 NFL Draft. In his rookie season he played in four games and made his NFL debut at the Cincinnati Bengals on December 9.

Fry was released from the Rams' practice squad on October 28, 2008 to make room for offensive tackle Jason Capizzi.

Cleveland Browns
Fry was signed to the practice squad of the Cleveland Browns on November 5, 2008. After finishing the season on the practice squad, he was re-signed to a future contract on January 7, 2009. He was waived during final cuts on September 5.

Carolina Panthers
Fry was signed to the practice squad of the Carolina Panthers on September 6, 2009.

Denver Broncos
Fry signed a future contract with the Denver Broncos on January 7, 2010.

On August 18, 2010, he was waived by the Broncos.

External links
Carolina Panthers bio

1983 births
Living people
People from Summerville, South Carolina
Players of American football from South Carolina
American football centers
Clemson Tigers football players
St. Louis Rams players
Cleveland Browns players
Carolina Panthers players
Denver Broncos players
Clemson Tigers football coaches
SMU Mustangs football coaches